is a railway station operated by Meitetsu's  Tokoname Line located in Minami Ward, Nagoya, Aichi Prefecture,  Japan. It is located 1.4 rail kilometers from the terminus of the line at Jingū-mae Station.

History
Toyodahommachi Station was opened on February 20, 1957. From 1983–1984, the tracks were elevated. On December 10, 2004, the Tranpass system of magnetic fare cards with automatic turnstiles was implemented, and the station has been unattended since that point.

Lines
Meitetsu
Tokoname Line

Layout
Toyoda Honmachi Station has one elevated island platform.

Platforms

Adjacent stations

External links
  Meitetsu Station information

Notes

Railway stations in Aichi Prefecture
Railway stations in Japan opened in 1957
Stations of Nagoya Railroad